The Paraavis Dart is a Russian single-place paraglider that was designed and produced by Paraavis of Moscow. It is now out of production.

Design and development
The Dart was designed as a competition and performance glider.

Specifications (Dart)

References

Dart
Paragliders